Leucobrephos brephoides, the scarce infant moth, is a moth of the family Geometridae. The species was first described by Francis Walker in 1857. It is found in North America from Yukon to Labrador and south to New York and southern Alberta and British Columbia. The habitat consists of open mixed wood forests of the boreal and mountain region.
 
The wingspan is about 29 mm. Adults are on wing from March to May with a peak in mid to late April in Alberta. Generally, the flight period begins when snow patches are still on the ground.

The larvae feed on Populus tremuloides, Betula papyrifera and Alnus, but have also been recorded on Salix and Populus balsamifera. All these species produce catkins early in spring, which may be important food sources for larvae to the appearance of leaves.

References

Archiearinae
Moths described in 1857